Bowie Town Center is an outdoor shopping mall located in Bowie, Maryland that opened in November 2001.  The mall is located on Emerald Way near the interchange of US Route 301 and US Route 50.  Bowie Town Center has 79 stores including Macy's, Safeway, Best Buy, and LA Fitness.

History
The town center opened in 2001 with anchors Sears, Hecht's, Barnes & Noble, Old Navy, and Bed Bath & Beyond with Safeway and Best Buy soon to open. Safeway opened in early 2002, with a 65,000 sq ft store that included an in-store Starbucks, a prepared foods department, and a dry cleaners in addition to a redesigned store layout. Hecht's closed on September 9, 2006, and was converted into Macy's. Bed Bath & Beyond closed its doors on September 7, 2012. LA Fitness opened its doors at the former Bed Bath & Beyond space on November 15, 2013. In 2015, Sears Holdings spun off 235 of its properties, including the Sears at Bowie Town Center, into Seritage Growth Properties. On October 15, 2018, it was announced the Sears store would be closing as part of a plan to close 142 stores nationwide as a result of filing for Chapter 11 bankruptcy. The Sears store closed January 6, 2019.

Current tenants
Safeway (2001–present)
Best Buy (2001–present)
Macy's (2006–present)
LA Fitness (2013–present)

Former tenants
Sears (2001-2019)
Hecht's (2001-2006)
Bed Bath & Beyond (2001-2012)

References

External links

2001 establishments in Maryland
Buildings and structures in Bowie, Maryland
Shopping malls established in 2001
Washington Prime Group
Shopping malls in Maryland
Shopping malls in the Washington metropolitan area